Baron Montagu of Beaulieu (Engl. pronunciation: "bewley", from French beau, "beautiful" and lieu, "place"), in the County of Hampshire, is a title in the Peerage of the United Kingdom. It was created in 1885 for the Conservative politician Lord Henry Montagu Douglas Scott, who had earlier represented Selkirkshire and South Hampshire in the House of Commons. He was the second son of Walter Montagu Douglas Scott, 5th Duke of Buccleuch (see the Duke of Buccleuch for earlier history of the family). His son, the second Baron, sat as a Conservative Member of Parliament for New Forest. The 3rd Baron Montagu of Beaulieu was one of the ninety elected hereditary peers that remain in the House of Lords after the passing of the House of Lords Act 1999, and sat on the Conservative benches. As descendants of the 5th Duke of Buccleuch, the Barons Montagu of Beaulieu are also in remainder to this peerage and its subsidiary titles.

History
The seat of the Barons Montagu of Beaulieu is Beaulieu Palace House in Beaulieu, Hampshire. The house, built around the gatehouse of the monastery of Beaulieu Abbey (the extensive ruins of which are a major feature of the estate), was purchased in 1538 by Thomas Wriothesley, 1st Earl of Southampton, when the abbey was dissolved by Henry VIII. The house came into the Montagu family through the marriage of Ralph Montagu, 3rd Baron Montagu, and Lady Elizabeth Wriothesley, daughter of Thomas Wriothesley, 4th Earl of Southampton.

The first title to be created in the name of Beaulieu was for Edward Hussey. He was the husband of Lady Isabella Montagu, widow of William Montagu, 2nd Duke of Manchester, and daughter of John Montagu, 2nd Duke of Montagu, and adopted the surname of Hussey-Montagu in 1749. He was created Baron Beaulieu in 1762 and Earl of Beaulieu in 1784. Both titles were in the Peerage of Great Britain, and became extinct on his death in 1802.

The representation of the Montagu family (along with that of the Douglases, Dukes of Queensberry) later passed to the Scott family, headed by the Duke of Buccleuch, through the marriage of Henry Scott, 3rd Duke of Buccleuch, to Lady Elizabeth Montagu, daughter of George Montagu, 1st Duke of Montagu (of the 1766 creation). The Scotts then adopted the surname of Montagu Douglas Scott. As mentioned above, Lord Henry Montagu Douglas Scott, second son of the fifth Duke of Buccleuch, was created Baron Montagu of Beaulieu in 1885 and thereafter changed his surname to Douglas-Scott-Montagu.

The late owner of Beaulieu and his eldest son were both featured in Lord Montagu, a documentary by Luke Korem about Edward Montagu-Scott’s life and accomplishments. The film was screened twice at the Newport Beach Film Festival in Newport Beach, California, in 2013.

Barons Montagu of Beaulieu (1885)
Henry John Montagu-Scott, 1st Baron Montagu of Beaulieu (1832–1905)
John Walter Edward Montagu-Scott, 2nd Baron Montagu of Beaulieu (1866–1929)
Edward John Barrington Montagu-Scott, 3rd Baron Montagu of Beaulieu (1926–2015)
Ralph Douglas Montagu-Scott, 4th Baron Montagu of Beaulieu (born 1961)

The heir presumptive is the present holder's half-brother, the Hon. Jonathan Deane Montagu-Scott (born 1975).

See also
Montagu Douglas Scott family
Duke of Buccleuch
Duke of Montagu
Earl of Beaulieu
National Motor Museum
Beaulieu Abbey

Notes

References
 

Baronies in the Peerage of the United Kingdom
Noble titles created in 1885
Noble titles created for UK MPs